The Service Improvement Plan (SIP) was a program, during the years 2001–2009, mandated by the Canadian Radio-television and Telecommunications Commission (CRTC) to provide a defined level of basic telephone service to all Canadians, other than those so isolated that it is costly and impractical to reach. The companies completed the programs in the middle of the 2000-2009 decade, with a cut-off of availability to customers in 2007 or 2008 (Customers who did not act on the program must now bear the full cost of service improvement).

Origin

The process leading to SIP actually had its origins with an application on October 15, 1996 by Sprint Canada (owned by Call-Net) for an order by the CRTC to Northwestel to interconnect for long-distance service. On February 28, 1997, the CRTC denied the application, but started a public proceeding to determine if NorthwesTel's service area should have long-distance competition.

As a result of public hearings during 1997 on the issue, it became evident to the CRTC that there were locations that considered their phone service to be inferior. The CRTC issued Public Notice 97-42, Service to High Cost Serving Areas (PN 97-42). The objective was to hold hearings across Canada to determine a definition of basic service and to define high cost serving areas.

The CRTC held regional consultations on the issues of PN 97-42 in eight locations from Whitehorse, Yukon to Deer Lake, Newfoundland and Labrador during May and June 1998, and received comments and submissions from the public, telephone companies and other organizations. In some locations, video conferencing or audio conferencing brought additional communities into the regional consultations.

On October 19, 1999, the CRTC issued Telecom Decision 99-16], defining basic service as including security features such as Caller ID, local dial-up connectivity to the Internet, access to long-distance service, among other things. The CRTC also found that Northwestel's operating area was entirely a high-cost serving area, and that supplementary funding may be required to raise the level of phone service and to maintain that service in the face of competition.

Most incumbent local exchange carrier phone companies in Canada were ordered to submit Service Improvement Plans in order to bring all of their customers up to the basic service objective, and to provide service to unserved customers. Among the companies affected by this order were Northwestel, Bell Canada, Telus, MTS of Manitoba, NewTel of Newfoundland, SaskTel of Saskatchewan and Telebec of Quebec.

Implementation

Projects covered by the Service Improvement Plan included upgrade of long-distance circuits (often outdated microwave lines), replacement of central office equipment (again, often outdated), replacement of assorted radio telephone service technologies with wireline service or fixed radio link wireless services providing direct dial capability, and extension of service to unserved customers, again, with wireline or fixed radio link wireless services.

Cost sharing was a feature of the program. The benefitting customer paid a portion of the charges, usually the first $1,000 of usually the first $25,000. If the cost exceeded $25,000 to serve a customer, the customer was usually responsible to pay $1,000 plus any cost that exceeded $25,000. Such high cost was rare, and usually only occurred where the telephone company needed to install new microwave relay towers to service the customer.

The telephone companies typically phased the program over several years, usually no more than four, with the focus on improving service to the larger groups of customers first, and providing new service to larger groups of unserved customers first.

In the case of Northwestel, the four-year program involved distributing the project over the four jurisdictions the company's operating area covered: northern British Columbia, Yukon, the Northwest Territories, and Nunavut.

One small effect of the program was to better define ILEC service territories in rural areas that had not previously been served.  For example, Northwestel and Telus more clearly defined the service boundary between Wonowon and Fort St. John, British Columbia.

The Fort Fitzgerald, Alberta area was transferred to Northwestel as a result of an order in 2003, since it could be served by Northwestel at a much lower cost than by Telus. Fort Fitzgerald was a minor contentious issue with Telus, as Northwestel claimed it did not serve Alberta, while Telus stated that Northwestel did have some customers in Alberta, possibly having been served by the Fort Smith Telephone Company before it was sold in 1964 to the predecessor of Northwestel.

Northwestel area implementation

Northwestel was required to file its SIP by January 31, 2000, a year before the requirement on the other companies.

The plan largely consisted of replacing equipment in exchanges and on long-distance networks. This equipment was mostly manufacturer-discontinued, or no longer supported, but the equipment continued to meet the company's operational requirements. Much of this equipment was on routes and in communities where economic activity would not generate the revenue required to replace the equipment, without carrying loans over an extremely long period of time. This had the effect that a market case could not be generated to gain shareholder (Bell Canada) approval to spend the limited capital funding to replace it with modern equipment.

The original planned cost was $76 million. The CRTC cut the program to $67 million, eliminating a plan for local dial-up Internet access in small communities, and also removing Caller ID as part of the basic service objective within the Northwestel operating area. Many existing exchanges cannot support Caller ID, but the only reason to replace them was to provide this feature, therefore, the CRTC ruled that the cost was too high.

In 2003, however, at the company's request, the CRTC reviewed the issue of local access to the Internet, found that other Internet service providers had not expanded service to unserved communities, and authorized Northwestel to provide the service, under the SIP program, to any small community that did not already have a local provider.

An effort in 2002–2003 to have Caller ID covered under the program, in response to community demands for its safety features, was also refused. However, four fairly large communities were allowed to have the cost included under the program, since the CRTC decided the market conditions were favourable in those four locations.

One of the key elements of the SIP program for Northwestel was the provision of new and improved service to customer premises. Numerous rural areas had no wireline service, and the few customers in those subdivisions with service had some form of wireless service, cellular when possible, manual radio telephone service elsewhere. Some customers could not use any wireless service, even satellite phones, due to their location in a gully with a hill to the south.

The SIP program focused on providing wireline, where feasible, to these areas. As the program met these needs, existing customers served by party line service, or private lines with a long reach back to the central office, were next to be upgraded. (Such long lines had a resultant hum on the line caused by amplifiers. They also had low fax/modem speeds due to signal attenuation.) Finally, individual isolated customers requiring fixed radio link services were to be provided service.

All three aspects — exchange replacement, long-distance route improvement and customer premises connections — were spread over the four-year phasing of the program of the 2001 planning year to the 2004 planning year. Work continued into 2007.

References

Telecommunications in Canada